Warren is a city in Macomb County in the U.S. state of Michigan. The 2020 Census places the city's population at 139,387, making Warren the largest city in Macomb County, the third largest city in Michigan, and one of Metro Detroit's core cities.
The city is home to a wide variety of businesses, including General Motors Technical Center, the United States Army Detroit Arsenal, home of the United States Army TACOM Life Cycle Management Command and the Tank Automotive Research, Development and Engineering Center (TARDEC), the headquarters of Big Boy Restaurants International, and Asset Acceptance. The current mayor is James R. Fouts, who was elected to his first mayoral term in November 2007.

History
Beebe's Corners, the original settlement in what would become the city of Warren, was founded in 1830 at the corner of Mound Road and Chicago Road; its first resident was Charles Groesbeck.  Beebe's Corners was a carriage stop between Detroit and Utica, and included a distillery, mill, tavern, and trading post.  It was not until 1837 that the now-defunct Warren Township was organized around the settlement, first under the name Hickory, then renamed Aba in April 1838, and finally renamed Warren shortly thereafter.  It was named for War of 1812 veteran, and frontier cleric, Rev. Abel Warren.  However, when it was originally organized the township was named for Rev. Warren who was a Methodist Episcopal preacher who left his native New York in 1824 for Shelby Township.  He went throughout the present-day Macomb, Lapeer, Oakland, and St. Clair Counties, baptizing, marrying, and burying pioneers of the area, as well as establishing congregations and preaching extensively.  He was the first licensed preacher in the State of Michigan.

Another version of the source of the city's name claims it was "named for General Joseph Warren, who fell at the Battle of Bunker Hill.

The settlement was formally incorporated as the Village of Warren from Warren Township on April 28, 1893 out of one square mile bound by 14 Mile Road and 13 Mile Road to the north and south, and in half-a-mile east and west of Mound Road. The small village grew slowly, and had a population of 582 in 1940 and 727 in 1950, while the larger surrounding township grew at a much quicker pace. Much of this growth was due to the construction of the Chrysler's Truck Assembly plant in 1938, the Detroit Arsenal Tank Plant in 1940 to support the WW II effort, and the General Motors Technical Center between 1949 and 1956.

The Red Run and Bear Creek, just small creeks back in the 1800s, has blossomed into an open major inter-county stormdrain flowing through Warren, into the Clinton River, and onwards to Lake St. Clair.

The Village of Warren and most of the surrounding Township of Warren, together with Van Dyke, incorporated as a city in 1957, less the city of Center Line, which had incorporated as a village from Warren Township in 1925 and as a city in 1936. Between 1950 and 1960, Warren's population soared from 42,653 to 89,426. This population explosion was largely  fueled by the post-WWII Baby Boom and later, by white flight from its southern neighbor of Detroit in that decade. This change in population continued into the next decade when the city's population doubled again, ultimately reaching a high of 179,000 in 1970.

The subsequent decades have seen Warren's population decline, while violent crime has increased.  Combined with collapsing housing prices, down -53% between 2011 and 2016, this has led Warren to a number 7 ranking in Forbes' Most Miserable Cities to Live in the US; joining two other Michigan cities, Detroit and Flint, in the Top 10.

Mayors 
The following is a list of the previous mayors of the city. The current mayor is James Fouts. Mayoral elections are currently non-partisan.

Geography
Warren is a core city of Metro Detroit. The city covers a six-mile-by-six mile, 8mile through 14 mile (10 km x 10 km) square in the southwest corner of Macomb County in Metro Detroit (minus Center Line, which is a small city totally enclosed within Warren). Warren shares its entire southern border with the northern border of the Detroit city limits. Other cities bordering on Warren are Hazel Park, Madison Heights, Sterling Heights, Fraser, Roseville, and Eastpointe.

Climate
Warren features a humid continental climate (Köppen: Dfa). Summers are somewhat hot with temperatures exceeding 90 °F (32 °C) on average 8.6 days. Winters are cold, with temperatures not rising above freezing on 39.1 days annually, while dropping to or below 0 °F (−18 °C) on average 1.2 days a year.

Main highways
 cuts east and west through the middle of Warren.
, which is Van Dyke Avenue (also known as the Earle Memorial Highway), leads into Van Dyke Freeway runs north and south and (roughly) bisects the city.
 also known as Groesbeck Highway named for former Governor Alex Groesbeck is near the eastern edge of Warren. It comes north from Detroit, and is a fast and wide diagonal connector to northern Macomb County.
 more commonly known as 8 Mile Road or more esoterically as Base Line Road is the city's south border.

Unnumbered roads
Mound Road is an important north–south artery in the city. East-west travel is mainly on the mile roads. Most notable are 8 Mile Road, which is on the southern border of Warren with Detroit; 11 Mile Road, which serves as a service drive for I-696, and 14 Mile Road, which is on the northern border of Warren with Sterling Heights.

Demographics

The remaining figures are from the 2000 census except when otherwise stated.  The top six reported ancestries (people were allowed to report up to two ancestries, thus the figures will generally add to more than 100%) in Warren in 2000 were Polish (21.0%), German (20.4%), Irish (11.5%), Italian (10.6%), English (7.3%), and French (5.3%).

There were 55,551 households, out of which 27.8% had children under the age of 18 living with them, 49.7% were married couples living together, 11.7% had a female householder with no husband present, and 33.9% were non-families. 28.8% of all households were made up of individuals, and 12.0% had someone living alone who was 65 years of age or older. The average household size was 2.47 and the average family size was 3.05.

The city's age distribution was 22.9% under 18, 7.6% from 18 to 24, 30.8% from 25 to 44, 21.4% from 45 to 64, and 17.3% who were 65 or older. The median age was 38 years. For every 100 females, there were 95.6 males. For every 100 females age 18 and over, there were 92.1 males.

The median income for a household in the city was $44,626, and the median income for a family was $52,444. Males had a median income of $41,454 versus $28,368 for females. The per capita income for the city was $21,407. 7.4% of the population and 5.2% of families were below the poverty line. Out of the total people living in poverty, 9.5% were under the age of 18 and 5.8% were 65 or older.

There are a number of distinguishing characteristics about Warren which render it unique among American cities of its relative size. Warren was one of the fastest-growing municipalities in the country between 1940 and 1970, roughly doubling its population every 10 years. In 1940 the official population of Warren Township was 22,146; in 1950, it was 42,653; in 1960, after Warren Township had become the City of Warren, population had risen to 89,240; and by 1970 it had grown to 179,260.

Since 1970, Warren has been consistently one of the faster-declining cities in population in the country. The population declined by 10% during each of the next two decades (1980: 161,060; 1990: 144,864), and dropped by 4.6% between 1990 and 2000.

In 1970, whites made up 99.5% of the city's total population of 179,270; only 838 non-whites lived within the city limits. Racial integration came slowly to Warren in the ensuing two decades, with the white portion of the city dropping only gradually to 98.2% in 1980 and 97.3% as of 1990.  At that point integration started to accelerate, with the white population declining to 91.3% in 2000 and reaching 78.4% as of the 2010 census.

For 2000, the non-Hispanic white population of Warren was 90.4% of the total population. African-American were 2.7% of the population (which is the same as the total non-white population in 1990), Asians were 3.1% of the population, Native Americans 0.4%, other groups 0.3% and those reporting two or more races were 2.2% of the population. Hispanics or Latinos or any race were 1.4% of the population.

Warren's population was as of 2000 one of the oldest among large cities in the United States. 16.1% of Warren's population was 65 or older at the last census, tied for fifth with Hollywood, Florida among cities with 100,000+ population, and in fact the highest-ranking city by this measure outside of Florida or Hawaii. Warren is ranked 1st in the nation for longevity of residence. Residents of Warren on average have lived in that community 35.5 years, compared to the national average of eight years for communities of 100,000+ population. Warren remains a population center for people of Polish, Lebanese, Ukrainian, Albanian, Scots-Irish, Filipino, Maltese and Assyrian/Chaldean descent.

The post-1970 population change in Warren has been so pronounced that by 2000 there were 1,026 Filipinos in Warren as well as 1,145 Asian Indians in the city, and 1,559 American Indians. Many of the American Indians in Warren originated in the Southern United States with 429 Cherokee and 66 Lumbee. In fact the Lumbee were the third largest American Indian "tribe" in the city, with only the 193 Chippewa outnumbering them.

2010 census
As of the census of 2010, there were 134,056 people, 53,442 households, and 34,185 families residing in the city. The racial makeup of the city was 78.4% White, 13.5% African American, 0.4% Native American, 4.6% Asian, 0.4% from other races, and 2.6% from two or more races. Hispanic or Latino of any race were 2.1% of the population.

There were 53,442 households, of which 30.6% had children under the age of 18 living with them, 42.2% were married couples living together, 15.9% had a female householder with no husband present, 5.9% had a male householder with no wife present, and 36.0% were non-families. 30.4% of all households were made up of individuals, and 12.6% had someone living alone who was 65 years of age or older. The average household size was 2.49 and the average family size was 3.11.

The median age in the city was 39.4 years. 22.7% of residents were under the age of 18; 9% were between the ages of 18 and 24; 26.1% were from 25 to 44; 26.1% were from 45 to 64; and 16.1% were 65 years of age or older. The gender makeup of the city was 48.4% male and 51.6% female.

Between 2000 and 2010, the Asian population in Warren increased to almost 6,200, a 46% increase. This was a much slower growth rate than that of the African-American population that grew from 3,700 to over 18,000 or a more than 300% increase.

Mid-2010s estimates
The 2014 census estimate placed Warren's population at 134,398, of which the non-Hispanic white population was estimated to be 74.4%. The corresponding 2014 percentages for African-Americans and Asian-Americans was 15% and 6%, respectively. Latinos, Native Americans, Pacific islanders, those reporting two or more races and those reporting some other race were not noticeably changed from the 2010 percentages.

The 2015 census estimate placed Warren's population at 135,358.

Economy

Warren is home to several companies, including Big Boy Restaurants.

Top employers
According to the city's 2020 Comprehensive Annual Financial Report, the top five employers in the city are:

Government and infrastructure

Municipal government
The Warren municipal government is composed of a Mayor, City Council, Clerk, and different boards and commissions. Boards include the Zoning Board of Appeals, Board of Review, Employee Retirement Board of Trustees, and Construction Board of Appeals.  Commissions include Animal Welfare, Beautification, Compensation, Crime, Cultural, Disabilities, Historical, Housing, Library, Planning, Police & Fire, and Village Historic District Commissions.

First Amendment lawsuit
The City of Warren established a Christian prayer station at city hall that is operated by the Pentecostal Tabernacle Church of Warren. Douglas Marshall requested establishing a reason station. Mayor James R. Fouts personally refused to grant Marshall's request in a letter based, in part, on the claim that the station would disrupt those using the prayer station. The American Civil Liberties Union, Americans United for Separation of Church and State, and Freedom from Religion Foundation jointly filed a complaint against the city. In 2015 there was a $100,000 judgment against the city government and mayor James R. Fouts for denying Marshall the right to establish his atheist station.

Federal representation
The United States Postal Service operates the Warren Post Office.

Neighborhoods

Southeast Warren (48089) 
Southeast Warren consists of the Belangers Garden, Berkshire Manor, Piper Van Dyke, Warrendale, and the southern portion of Warren Woods. The neighborhood population in 2009 was 33,031. The neighborhood's racial makeup was 70.14% White, 15.50% African-American, 2.27% Asian, 0.38% Native American, and 6.80% of other races. 1.84% were Hispanic or Latino of any race.

The neighborhood's median household income in 2009 was $35,136. The per capita income was $15,301.

Much of Southeast Warren's residential architecture is based on the Bungalows built immediately after World War II. To the north of Stephens Road, many homes were built after 1960 in the brick ranch style. Besides the residential areas, Southeast Warren is also occupied by multiple industrial parks.

Southwest Warren (48091)
Southwest Warren consists of the Beierman Farms and Fitzgerald neighborhoods. The neighborhood population in 2009 was 30,876. The neighborhood's racial makeup was 81.98% White, 7.9% African-American, 4.98% Asian, 0.48% Native American, and 4.23% of other races. 1.64% were Hispanic or Latino of any race.

The neighborhood's median household income in 2009 was $40,311. The per capita income was $19,787.

Northeast Warren (48090, 48093, 48088)
Northeast Warren consists of the Bear Creek, Bella Vista Estates, Downtown, Fairlane Estates, Lorraine, Northampton Square, the northern portion of Warren Woods, and the eastern portion of Warren Con neighborhoods. The neighborhood population in 2009 was 45,492. The neighborhood's racial makeup was 92.47% White, 2.93% African American, 2.78% Asian, 0.5% Native American and 3.75% of other races. 1.36% were Hispanic or Latino of any race.

The neighborhood's median household income in 2009 was $48,806. The per capita income was $27,914.

Northwest Warren/Warren Con. (48092)
Northwest Warren consists of the western portion of the Warren Con neighborhood. The neighborhood population in 2009 was 24,997. The neighborhood's racial makeup was 85.50% White, 4.58% African American, 6.57% Asian, 0.19% Native American and 3.50% of other races. 1.32% were Hispanic or Latino of any race.

The median household income in 2009 was $55,102. The per capita income was $25,334.

Education

Public schools

Warren is served by six public school districts, including:
 Center Line Public Schools
 Eastpointe Community Schools
 Fitzgerald Public Schools
 Van Dyke Public Schools
 Warren Consolidated Schools
 Warren Woods Public Schools

The Macomb Intermediate School District oversees the individual school districts.

Secondary schools serving Warren include:
 Warren Woods Tower High School
 Paul K. Cousino Sr. High School
 Lincoln High School
 Warren Mott High School
 Fitzgerald High School
 Center Line High School (Center Line)
 Eastpointe High School (Eastpointe)

Charter schools:
 Michigan Collegiate

Private schools
 Crown of Life Lutheran School
 De La Salle Collegiate High School (all-boys)
 Regina High School (all-girls)
 Mary Help of Christians Academy (1986–99)
 University Preparatory Academy: UPA Middle School everyone

Postsecondary institutions
 Macomb Community College (South Campus)
 Davenport University
 The Warren Center for Central Michigan University.
 Wayne State University's Advanced Technology Education Center.

Public libraries
Warren Public Library consists of one main library and three branches. The Civic Center Library is located on the ground floor of the city hall. The Arthur Miller Branch is inside the Warren Community Center. The other two branches are the Maybelle Burnette Branch and the Dorothy Busch Branch.

On July 1, 2010, the three branch libraries were closed. On August 3, the Library Millage was approved; as such, these branch libraries reopened later that August.

Health care
The headquarters of the St. John Providence Health System are in the St. John Providence Health Corporate Services Building in Warren.

Religion

The Roman Catholic Archdiocese of Detroit operates Catholic Churches.

Our Lady of Grace Vietnamese Parish is in Warren. Our Lady of Grace was previously in Eastpointe, but moved to Warren in 2011 when it merged with St. Cletus Church. St. Cletus had a predominately native-born population and had a declining parishioner base, and it could not find enough priests to staff the facility; meanwhile Our Lady of Grace had an increasing parishioner base and was asking for a larger facility.

Other parishes include: St. Faustina Parish, St. Louise de Marillac Parish, St. Mark Parish, St. Martin de Porres Parish, and St. Mary-Our Lady Queen of Families Parish (St. Dorothy Site). St. Mark's first building opened in 1943.

St. Mary, Our Lady Queen of Families was formed by the 2007 merger of Ascension Parish, St. Clement Parish, St. Leonard of Port Maurice Parish, and St. Teresa of Avila Parish. St. Faustina Church formed in 2013 through the merger of St. Edmund Church and St. Sylvester Church.

Culture and recreation
The City of Warren has a Department of Parks and Recreation which oversees the Aquatic, Community, and Fitness Centers along with a system of 24 parks. The Warren Symphony Orchestra gives several concerts per season and changed its name to the Warren Symphony Orchestra in 2016
In 2003 the city built a brand new Community Center where the old Warren High School was.

There is also a nine-member Cultural Commission.

Universal Mall, an enclosed shopping mall, was built in the city in 1965. In 2009, it was demolished for a new outdoor shopping center.

The Italian American Cultural Society (IACS) had been located in Warren for a 20-year period. In 2004 it moved to its current location in Clinton Township. Its previous location was sold to a charter school in July 2004.

Crime

The Warren Police Department serves as the main law enforcement agency in the city.

Warren formerly held the status of a "sundown town": an all-white municipality that outlawed the presence of people of color after sunset. Those who violated this social order were subjected to violence. Now it’s a very diverse city full of all different types of people and cultures. 

Warren's crime rate for 2018 was 509.03 per 100,000 population, a 1.14% increase from 2017.

Historical markers
There are nine recognized Michigan historical markers in the city. They are:
 Detroit Arsenal Tank Plant which built a quarter of the Sherman tanks produced by the United States in World War II, and which produced M1 Abrams tank (along with a plant in Lima, Ohio) until 1996.
 Detroit Memorial Park Cemetery. Inventor Elijah McCoy is buried there, as noted on the historical marker. Former member of the band The Supremes Florence Ballard is also buried there.
 Erin–Warren Fractional District No. 2 Schoolhouse is technically in Eastpointe, Michigan but is included because of its proximity (both in distance and in history) to Warren.
 General Motors Technical Center
 Warren Truck Assembly, on location since 1938
 Governor Alexander Joseph Groesbeck
 John Theisen House
 Village of Warren
 Warren Township District No. 4 School
 Warren Union Cemetery

The tenth and eleventh markers are technically in Center Line, Michigan but are included because of their proximity (both in distance and in history) to Warren:
 St. Clement Catholic Church
 St. Clement Catholic Cemetery

Additionally, about two dozen markers have been placed around designated sites in the city by the Warren Historical and Genealogical Society.

Notable people
Norm Augustinus, cult writer, comedian, actor; attended McKinley Elementary; featured Warren as backdrop to bestselling book Cats & Dogs.
Alex Avila, major league baseball catcher, attended high school in Warren.
Bruiser Brody, professional wrestler, attended high school in Warren.
Jim Daniels, writer, born in Warren.
Eminem, rapper and recording artist, attended Lincoln High School.
Denny Felsner, former NHL player, born in Warren.
Norman Geisler, Christian Theologian & Philosopher, born in Warren.
Harry Gozzard, jazz musician who lived in Warren from 1955 - 1995.
Alex J. Groesbeck, former Governor of Michigan, born in Warren.
Grant Hochstein, figure skater, born in Warren.
Matt Hunwick, active NHL player, born in Warren.
I See Stars, electronicore band, formed in Warren.
Joe Kopicki, NBA player, born and raised in Warren.
Mitch Ryder, rock and roll singer and recording artist, attended school in Warren.
John Smoltz, MLB pitcher in Hall of Fame, born in Warren.
Tom Stanton, New York Times bestselling author, born and raised in Warren.
Matt Taormina, active NHL player, born in Warren.
Doug Weight, retired NHL player, born in Warren.

References

External links

 City of Warren official site
 Warren Public Library
 

 
Cities in Macomb County, Michigan
Metro Detroit
1957 establishments in Michigan